Manija may refer to:

Manilaid, an Estonian island in the Gulf of Riga also known as Manija
Manija, Estonia, a village on the island of Manilaid, Estonia
Manija Dawlat (born 1982), Tajik pop singer

See also
Mania (disambiguation)
Manja (disambiguation)